Global Records is a Romanian independent record label founded in 2008 by Ștefan Lucian.

History 

Global Records's first signed artist was Inna in 2008, whose career has been spanning over 10 years. She has released a series of international hits such as "Hot" (2008), "Sun Is Up" (2010), and "More than Friends" (2013) and recorded collaborations with performers including Daddy Yankee and J Balvin. In January 2020, the Romanian public television (TVR) announced a collaboration with the record label to select the Romanian representative for the Eurovision Song Contest 2020, with Roxen being selected with her track "Alcohol You". The contest was however cancelled on 18 March 2020 due to the COVID-19 pandemic. Rotterdam hosted the 2021 contest, and Roxen competed with the track "Amnesia". In February 2022, Wrs released the single "Llámame", with which he represented Romania at the Eurovision Song Contest 2022.

Since August 2020, Global Records has been collaborating with Warner Music Group to promote its artists internationally and to license the Warner repertoire in Romania. The first joint campaign was for Roxen and their then-latest single "How to Break a Heart". As of 2020, Global Records has launched regional divisions in Poland (Global Records Polska), Russia (Global Records Russia) and Turkey (Global Records Turkey).

Artists 
 
 5GANG
 911 (Nouă Unșpe)
 ADI Istrate
 Alberto Grasu
 Alduts Sherdley
 Alex Velea
 Alina Eremia
 AMI
 Antonia
 Azteca
 Bastien
 Carla's Dreams
 Cezar Guna
 Corina
 Dayana
 Delia
 Diana Brescan
 DJ Project
 Domino
 EMAA
 Erika Isac
 Eva Timush
 Florian Rus
 Gheboasa
 Gipsy Casual
 Golani
 Gran Error
 Holy Molly
 INNA
 IRAIDA
 Irina Rimes
 Iuliana Beregoi
 Karla Miles
 KEPPER
 Killa Fonic
 Lil Cagula
 Mara Georgescu
 Mark Stam
 M.G.L.
 Minelli
 Nane
 Nicole Cherry
 Olivia Addams
 OG Eastbull
 OTS
 PAX (Paradise Auxiliary)
 Qodës
 R3HAB
 Randi
 Rareș Mariș
 Rava
 Roxen
 Sickotoy
 Spania'99
 The Motans
 Theo Rose
 Vescan
 Wrs
 Yuka
 Zodier
 Ursaru
 Iuly Neamtu
 Quick
 Andrei G

References

External links 

 GlobalRecords.com - Official website
 Global Records Channel on YouTube
 

2008 establishments in Romania
Record labels established in 2008
Romanian music
Romanian record labels